Obsession (stylized in all caps) is the sixth studio album by South Korean–Chinese boy band Exo. It was released on November 27, 2019, by SM Entertainment. The album was released for pre-order on November 1, and is available in three versions: EXO, X-EXO, and OBSESSION, which was released on December 4. Obsession was Exo's first album to be promoted as a six-member group, as members Xiumin and D.O. were undergoing mandatory military service, and member Lay was promoting his solo activities in China.

Background and release
Obsession is the band's sixth Korean studio album and seventh overall. The album features 10 songs including the lead single, "Obsession". It follows the band's most recent studio album repackage Love Shot, released in December 2018. The album is the band's first release without members Xiumin and D.O., who were completing their mandatory military service.

Songs
The title track "Obsession" is described as a hip hop dance song featuring repeating spell-like vocal samples and a prominent heavy beat. The album features 10 tracks in a variety of genres.

"Trouble" is a dance song that contains various genre elements like trap and reggae. The lyrics are about falling for one deeply and having no exit.

"Jekyll" is a dance pop song with heavy drums, 808 bass along with dynamic vocal composition and transformation. The song's lyrics express an internal conflict with one's alter ego in an impactful way.

"Groove" is a song about lovers sharing affectionate feelings as if they were crossing reality & dream through dancing. The song features strings and flute instrumentation with a rhythmical chorus.

"Ya Ya Ya" is a hip hop dance song with lyrics expressing the belief that love begins in a single moment. The song has heavy 808 bass and an addictive chorus, featuring sampling from SWV's song "You're the One" (1996).

"Baby You Are" is a dance pop song with a romantic vibe and elements of folk instrumentation. The lyrics tell a story about the exciting moment of love at first sight.

"Non Stop" is a dance-funk song with lyrics romanticizing the unstoppable love between two people. The song features prominent brass and guitar instrumentation.

Promotion
On November 29, the band held their comeback showcase titled Exo The Stage, where they performed the lead single "Obsession" for the first time.

Track listing

Notes
 "Ya Ya Ya" contains a sample of "You're the One" performed by SWV.

Charts

Weekly charts

Year-end charts

Certifications and sales

Accolades

Release history

References

2019 albums
Exo albums
SM Entertainment albums
Korean-language albums
IRiver albums